Nellai Santhippu is a 2012 Indian Tamil-language crime thriller film directed by K.B.B. Naveen and starring Rohith, Bhushan, Megha Nair, and Devika.

Cast 
 Rohith
 Bhushan
 Megha Nair as Lalitha
 Devika Madhav as Manju
 P. L. Thenappan 
 Saravana Subbiah as Sethu 
 Shankarguru Raja
 Yogi Devaraj as Annachi
 Mayilsamy as a textile seller
 Lakshmy Ramakrishnan as a doctor

Production 
K.B.B.Naveen, who worked as an assistant director to K. S. Ravikumar, made his directorial debut with this film. The film is produced by Thirumalai. Newcomer Rohith plays the lead while P. L. Thenappan plays the antagonist. The film was shot in Tirunelveli. The other lead roles are played by newcomer Bhushan, Megha Nair, and Devika while Saravana Subbiah plays an important role.

Soundtrack 
The songs are composed by Yugendran.

Release 
The Times of India gave the film a rating of one-and-a-half out of five stars and noted that "The fairly engaging script even helps gloss over the fact that the lead actors can't emote". The New Indian Express wrote that "The knot did have the potential to turn into an engaging thriller, but fails". A critic from Dinamalar praised the story, but criticized the below par execution.

References 

2012 films
2012 crime thriller films
Indian prison films
Indian crime thriller films
Films about police brutality
2010s Tamil-language films
Fictional portrayals of the Tamil Nadu Police